Fuqua is an American surname, possibly an Americanization of the French surname Fouquet.

Notable people 
Henry L. Fuqua (1865–1926), Governor of Louisiana
Samuel G. Fuqua (1899–1987), US Navy seaman and Medal of Honor recipient
Ivan Fuqua (1909–1994), American track athlete and coach
Charlie Fuqua (1910–1971), American singer, member of The Ink Spots
J. B. Fuqua (1918–2006), American businessman and philanthropist
Harvey Fuqua (1929–2010), American singer and music industry executive
William Fuqua (born 1930), Justice of the Kentucky Supreme Court
Don Fuqua (born 1933), American politician from Florida
Charles Fuqua (Charlie) Manuel (Charlie Manuel) (born 1944), American baseball player and manager
John Fuqua (1946), American football player
Rich Fuqua (born 1950), American college basketball player
Joseph Fuqua (born 1962), American actor, director, instructor, and playwright
Antoine Fuqua (born 1966), American film director
Ade Fuqua (born 1970), American football player and public official
Chris (Critter) Fuqua, American musician, former member of Old Crow Medicine Show
Matt Fuqua, American musician, member of The Afters

Other uses
The Fuqua School of Business at Duke University, named after J.B. Fuqua
The Fuqua School in Farmville, Virginia, named after J.B. Fuqua

Places
Lake Fuqua and Fuqua Park in Duncan, Oklahoma, named after Fort Worth politician Herbert Breedlove Fuqua

References 

Americanized surnames